Anthony Frank Settember (July 10, 1926 – May 4, 2014) was a racing driver and engineer from the United States. He was born in Manila, Philippines.

He participated in seven Formula One World Championship Grands Prix, debuting on July 21, 1962. He scored no championship points. Settember was the nominal head of the Scirocco racing team, and a very efficient driver in sportscars. In addition, he competed in the Trans-Am Series and attempted to qualify for the 1983 Winston Western 500 in the NASCAR Winston Cup Series.

His last known participation in motorsport was on his 70th birthday.

Settember died after a short illness at a hospice in Reno, Nevada in May 2014.

Complete Formula One World Championship results 
(key)

Complete Formula One Non-Championship results
(key) (Races in bold indicate pole position)
(Races in italics indicate fastest lap)

References

External links
Profile at www.grandprix.com

American racing drivers
American Formula One drivers
1926 births
2014 deaths
24 Hours of Le Mans drivers
Emeryson Formula One drivers
Scirocco-Powell Formula One drivers
World Sportscar Championship drivers